Anu Prabhakar, also known by her married name Anu Prabhakar Mukherjee, is an Indian actress, who predominantly appears in Kannada films and a few Tamil films.

Early life
Anu was born in Bangalore to M. V. Prabhakar, an employee with Bharat Heavy Electricals, and dubbing artiste and actress Gayathri Prabhakar. Anu grew up in the Malleswaram suburb of Bangalore, and studied in the Nirmala Rani High School. She appeared as a child artiste in Kannada films Chapala Chennigaraya (1990) and Shanti Kranti (1991), and English film Mysteries of the Dark Jungle (1990). While she dropped out of college when her career as a heroine took off she later went on to pursue a master's degree in sociology from Karnataka University through correspondence.

Career
Anu made her debut as a heroine in 1999 with Hrudaya Hrudaya opposite Shiva Rajkumar and became a top rung heroine in Kannada films. She formed a popular pair with Ramesh Aravind. She has co-starred with superstar Vishnuvardhan in several films like Soorappa, Jamindarru, Hrudayavantha, Sahukaara and Varsha. Anu has acted in a few Tamil movies as well. In 2009, she gave her voice to an HIV/AIDS education animated software tutorial created by nonprofit organisation TeachAids. In her 2020 film based on the life of 12th-century Kannada poet Akka Mahadevi, she played a dual role; one of the poet and the other of Jyothi, a girl who pursues PhD on the poet.

Awards
Anu Prabhakar was honoured by Bangalore's Kolada Math, with the title 'Abhinaya Saraswathi' for her performance in various films. She has won other awards such as 'Karnataka State Government best actress award 2000–01'.

Personal life
In April 2016, Anu married Raghu Mukherjee, a model-turned-actor. They have a daughter named Nandana. Earlier she was married to Krishna Kumar, son of actress Jayanthi and they had divorced in January 2014 citing differences.

Filmography

Films

Television
 Bale Bangara
 Home Minister
 Shrimati Karnataka
 Manju Musukida Haadi
 Nooru Dinagalu
 Triveni Sangama
Nannamma Super Star (Judge)

References

External links

 

Year of birth missing (living people)
Actresses from Bangalore
Indian film actresses
Actresses in Kannada cinema
Actresses in Tamil cinema
Living people
20th-century Indian actresses
21st-century Indian actresses
Child actresses in Kannada cinema
Indian television actresses
Actresses in Kannada television
Mount Carmel College, Bangalore alumni